The 17th Toronto Film Critics Association Awards, honoring the best in film for 2013, were awarded on December 17, 2013. The award for Best Canadian Film was announced on January 7, 2014.

Winners

References

2013
2013 film awards
2013 in Toronto
2013 in Canadian cinema